The Thermoanaerobacteraceae is a highly polyphyletic family of bacteria placed within the class clostridia. Originally placed within the highly polyphyletic class Clostridia and order Thermoanaerobacterales, according to the NCBI and LPSN, it is now thought to be a basal clade of the phylum Bacillota.

Phylogeny 
The currently accepted taxonomy is based on the List of Prokaryotic names with Standing in Nomenclature (LPSN)  and National Center for Biotechnology Information (NCBI)the phylogeny is based on 16S rRNA-based LTP release 111 by The All-Species Living Tree Project

References 

Thermoanaerobacterales